Gabriel Mascaró Febrer (born 7 March 1944) is a Spanish former racing cyclist. He rode in three editions of the Tour de France and two of the Vuelta a España.

Major results

1964
 3rd Overall Cinturón a Mallorca
1st Stage 2
1965
 1st Stage 2 Cinturón a Mallorca
1968
 3rd Clásica a los Puertos de Guadarrama
1969
 1st Subida a Urkiola
 3rd Overall Vuelta a la Comunidad Valenciana
 7th Overall Volta a Catalunya
 7th Overall Vuelta a Andalucía
1970
 1st GP Cuprosan
 1st Stage 2 Vuelta a Mallorca
 2nd Prueba Villafranca de Ordizia
 9th Overall Volta a Catalunya
1971
 2nd Subida a Arrate
 3rd Gran Premio Nuestra Señora de Oro

Grand Tour general classification results timeline

References

External links
 

1944 births
Living people
Spanish male cyclists
Sportspeople from Mallorca
Cyclists from the Balearic Islands